Kiran may refer to:

Names
 Kiran (given name), an Indian given name used for men or women (including a list of persons with the name)
 Kiran, an anglicised variant of the Gaelic given name Ciarán

People
 Kiran, pseudonym of the Indian writer Kanchinath Jha
 Sashi Kiran, Fijian founder and director of non-profit community organisation

Places
 Kirən, a village and municipality in Azerbaijan
 Kiran, a spelling variant of Karan, which may refer to several place names in Iran, see Karan, Iran (disambiguation)
 Kiran, Sri Lanka, a town in Sri Lanka
 Kiran, Republic of Buryatia, a small town in Buryatia, Russia

Other
 Kiran fonts, a Devanagari typeface and font
 HAL Kiran, an Indian aircraft
 Kiran (serial), a 2017 Pakistani television drama serial that aired on Geo Entertainment
 Kiran (college festival)
 Artocarpus odoratissimus, a tropical plant sometimes known as kiran

See also 
 Keeran (disambiguation)